This is a list of companies that have produced tabletop role-playing games in English, listed in order of the year that the company published its first role-playing game-related product (game, supplement, or magazine). Also listed is the years the company was active, and a list of notable role-playing games the company has produced.  This list makes note of the first edition of each game which a company published, and does not try to list subsequent editions of the same game published by the same company.

Publishers
Role-playing game publishing companies